Pelsochamops is an extinct genus of Chamopsiid lizard, containing the single species P. infrequens from the Santonian aged Csehbánya Formation of Hungary, known from a partial dentary and maxilla fragments. It is the first chamopsiid known from Europe, the rest being known from North America.

References 

Prehistoric reptile genera
Santonian life
Late Cretaceous lepidosaurs of Europe
Fossils of Hungary
Fossil taxa described in 2013